The Stranger is a 2010 Canadian-American action film written by Quinn Scott, directed by Robert Lieberman, and starring former WWE wrestler Steve Austin. The film was released on direct-to-DVD and Blu-ray in the United States on June 1, 2010.

Plot

A mysterious stranger (Steve Austin) cannot remember his past or what has brought him to the places he finds himself in. Broken and confused, he will slowly find what happened to his loving family and his promising career. But with the determined FBI Agent Mason Reese (Adam Beach) on his trail, it will not be easy.

Cast
Steve Austin as Tom "The Stranger" Tomashevsky
Erica Cerra as Dr. Grace Bishop
Adam Beach as Mason Reese
Ron Lea as FBI Chief Ronald Picker
Viv Leacock as Agent Fleming
Jason Schombing as Agent Daniels
Stephen Dimopoulos as Mikhail Korchekov

Production 
It is set and filmed in Vancouver, British Columbia, Canada in 31 days on January 2 and February 2, 2009.
PG 13 Rating. The Stranger Debuted on # 4 on DVD Box office releases and sold 177000 DVD units in a month.

External links 
 

2010 films
2010 direct-to-video films
2010 action films
American action films
Canadian action films
English-language Canadian films
2010s English-language films
Films shot in Vancouver
Films directed by Robert Lieberman
2010s Canadian films
2010s American films